Elections to Watford Borough Council were held on 1 May 2003. One third of the council was up for election and the Liberal Democrats gained overall control of the council from no overall control. Overall turnout was 32.05%.

After the election, the composition of the council was:
Liberal Democrat 20
Labour 8
Conservative 7
Green 1

Council election result

Ward results

References
2003 Watford election result
Ward results

2003
2003 English local elections
2000s in Hertfordshire